Trouble sleeping may refer to:
 Trouble sleeping, also known as insomnia
 "Trouble Sleeping" (song), a song by Corinne Bailey Rae
 Trouble Sleeping (film), a 2015 film